Geraldo Majela de Castro (June 24, 1930 – May 14, 2015) was a Roman Catholic archbishop.

Ordained to the priesthood in 1953, de Castro was named coadjutor of the Diocese of Montes Claros, Brazil in 1982 and became bishop of the diocese in 1988. In 2001 the Montes Claros diocese became an archdiocese. de Castro retired in 2007.

Notes

1930 births
2015 deaths
21st-century Roman Catholic archbishops in Brazil
Roman Catholic archbishops of Montes Claros
Roman Catholic bishops of Montes Claros